The Broadway business corridor in Long Beach, California is loosely defined as a three-mile stretch of East Broadway between Downtown Long Beach and Belmont Shore. It includes the area around Bixby Park sometimes referred to as a "gayborhood" because of the concentration of gay-owned and/or gay-friendly businesses. The Gay and Lesbian Center of Greater Long Beach is located on nearby 4th Street.

Broadway is also the location of several restaurants, specialty stores, bars and coffee houses.

Long Beach has one of the largest gay and lesbian populations in the country. The city's Gay Pride Parade, which goes down nearby Ocean Blvd., is the second largest in the United States, and is the second largest event in Long Beach after the Long Beach Grand Prix.

The On Broadway merchant association is part of a renewed interest in Broadway. With many historic homes in the area, including California Bungalows, between Ocean Blvd. and 4th St., with Broadway in the center, there has been a recent gentrification of the neighborhood.

References

Neighborhoods in Long Beach, California
Gay villages in California
Entertainment districts in California
Restaurant districts and streets in the United States
Geography of Long Beach, California